Longitarsus varicornis is a species of flea beetle in the family Chrysomelidae. It is found in the Caribbean Sea, Central America, North America, and South America.

References

Further reading

External links

 

Longitarsus
Articles created by Qbugbot
Beetles described in 1868